Kalleh Shahtut (also Romanized as Kalleh Shahtūt; also known as Qal‘eh-ye Shāhtūt) is a village in Nazil Rural District, Nukabad District, Khash County, Sistan and Baluchestan Province, Iran. At the 2006 census, its population was 330, in 64 families.

References 

Populated places in Khash County